Chukwuemeka Woke (also known as Emeka Woke) is an engineer and politician of the People's Democratic Party. He has served as chairman of Emohua local government area of Rivers State, Nigeria. In June 2015, incumbent Governor Ezenwo Wike appointed him to serve as the Chief of Staff. of Rivers State Government

Controversies 
The state arrested Woke for leading a killer squad in two sport utility vehicles that trailed and opened fire on Dakuku Peterside.

See also
List of people from Rivers State

References

Engineers from Rivers State
People from Emohua
Rivers State Peoples Democratic Party politicians
Chiefs of Staff of Rivers State
Mayors of places in Rivers State
Living people
First Wike Executive Council
Year of birth missing (living people)